Jhalda is a city and a municipality in Purulia district in the Indian state of West Bengal. It is the headquarters of the Jhalda subdivision.

Geography

Location

According to the District Census Handbook 2011, Puruliya, Jhalda municipality covered an area of 3.85 km2.

Area overview
Purulia district forms the lowest step of the Chota Nagpur Plateau. The general scenario is undulating land with scattered hills. Jhalda subdivision, shown in the map alongside, is located in the western part of the district, bordering Jharkhand. The Subarnarekha flows along a short stretch of its western border. It is an overwhelmingly rural subdivision with 91.02% of the population living in the rural areas and 8.98% living in the urban areas. There are 3 census towns in the subdivision. The map alongside shows some of the tourist attractions in the Ajodhya Hills. The area is home to Purulia Chhau dance with spectacular masks made at Charida. The remnants of old temples and deities are found in the subdivision also, as in other parts of the district.

Note: The map alongside presents some of the notable locations in the subdivision. All places marked in the map are linked in the larger full screen map.

Police station
Jhalda police station has jurisdiction over a part of  Jhalda municipal town, Jhalda I CD block and part of Jhalda II CD block. The area covered is 290 km2 and the population covered is 157,064. It has 48.7 km of inter-state border with Silli PS in Ranchi district and Kashmar and Jaridih police stations in Bokaro district of Jharkhand.

Demographic Data
The Jhalda Municipality has population of 19,544 of which 10,050 are males while 9,494 are females as per report released by Census India 2011.

Population of Children with age of 0-6 is 2474 which is 12.66 % of total population of Jhalda (M). In Jhalda Municipality, Female Sex Ratio is of 945 against state average of 950. Moreover Child Sex Ratio in Jhalda is around 982 compared to West Bengal state average of 956. Literacy rate of Jhalda city is 76.78 % higher than state average of 76.26 %. In Jhalda, Male literacy is around 85.49 % while female literacy rate is 67.50 %.

Jhalda Municipality has total administration over 3,676 houses to which it supplies basic amenities like water and sewerage. It is also authorize to build roads within Municipality limits and impose taxes on properties coming under its jurisdiction

Industrial History of Jhalda
Jhalda occupied an important place in the Industrial History of the world. Shellac in various shapes and models were exported to England, Germany and the USA. But the closure of the Shellac factories dealt a heavy blow to the economy of the Municipal centre; other trades like bidis and cutlery have dwindled over time.

Tourism
It is a small town surrounded by small hillocks. The main hills of the area are Shikra, Bansa, Kopla, Silphoir, Dungri etc. The places of interest of the area are Norahara, Murguma Dam, Dimu Dam, Kanrior, etc. Jhalda is adjacent to the state of Jharkhand (9 km from Muri. Jhalda Station is the railway station in the region. The village of Kotogara is on the other side of the mountains at Jhalda. Kotogara village is in Jharkhand. One of the main visit place is Ayodhya Hills its about 35 km from jhalda which situated in Baghmundi.

Transport
Jhalda railway station is situated on the Gomoh-Muri line. This town is also well connected with district headquarters Purulia and Ranchi by bus services. Toto and rickshaw is also available here for more comfort to travel.

Healthcare
Jhalda Rural Hospital, with 30 beds, is the major government medical facility in Jhalda I CD block.

References

External links 
 Jhalda on Google Maps 
 Jhalda on Wikimapia Maps 

Cities and towns in Purulia district
Cities in West Bengal